Wheatcroft is a small hamlet in the hills of Amber Valley, near Crich, Derbyshire, England. Wheatcroft has no shop or church and while it once had a chapel it has been renovated into a small dwelling.

Wheatcroft is split into two areas: Wheatcroft Mount and Lower Wheatcoft. Over twenty people live in permanent residence.

Wheatcroft has been in continued existence since 1066 as it is mentioned in the Domesday Book as having "4 houses" 1210 as it was recorded in a same of land under the name of "watedroft" Further evidence to support the antiquity of Wheatcroft comes from the early 15th century as one of the larger houses is said to have dated from this period. Until the mid-20th century a fayre came to Wheatcroft but that has since stopped. One of the houses was used in the ITV drama Peak Practice.

Of the houses three were built on land granted by the Lord of Wingfield Manor in the 17th century and were built from stone quarried from the village quarry, as most likely were most of the others. In addition to the chapel, as above now renovated into a second home, the village used to possess a Village Institute in which weekly social gatherings were held until the 1950s and over the years various shops including a general store and until the 1960s a lubricant and engineering shop. Two of the houses have medieval cruck barns as part of their outhouses and one of the houses used to be owned by the Hopkinson Nightingale family, a branch of the Nightingale family from Lea Hurst, the childhood home of Florence Nightingale.

Hamlets in Derbyshire
Geography of Amber Valley